Gavahnchan (also Romanized as Gāvahnchān; also known as Gāvān Chāh, Gavānchān-e Bālā, Gāwanchān, and Gavānchūn) is a village in Rameshk Rural District, Chah Dadkhoda District, Qaleh Ganj County, Kerman Province, Iran. At the 2006 census, its population was 122, in 30 families.

References 

Populated places in Qaleh Ganj County